The Ruhlander Schwarzwasser is a left-hand tributary of the Black Elster in the east German states of Brandenburg and Saxony.

Course 
It rises in the  Bernsdorf Forest (Bernsdorfer Gemeindewald) near , a village in the borough of Wiednitz (today part of Bernsdorf). As it makes its way westwards, this small river flows partly through the state of Brandenburg and partly through Saxony. In the Ruhland Heath (Ruhlander Heide) it forms the boundary between the two states.

It discharges into the Schwarze Elster near the town of Ruhland.

In Arnsdorf the Sieggraben dyke branches off on the left. It also enters the Black Elster, below Ruhland.

See also
List of rivers of Brandenburg
List of rivers of Saxony

References 

Rivers of Saxony
Rivers of Brandenburg
Rivers of Germany